Tarkarli is a village in Malvan taluka in Sindhudurg district in the Indian state of Maharashtra. It is a beach destination and remote place in southern Maharashtra. Few years ago, Tarkarli beach is declared as a Queen Beach of Konkan region. Monthly, Thousands of tourists are visiting this place to rejuvenate and enjoy thrill of water sports activities. All Watersports activities in Tarkarli are going on as per international safety of standards and under guidance of professional instructor(Dive Master) with modern safety equipment. Many scuba diving operators  running this activities near Tsunami island, Devbag because of shallow water and low life risk.   

The local people in Tarkarli renovate their homes and converted in to bed and breakfast scheme. Some of these are recognized by government agency known as MTDC(Maharashtra Tourism Development Corporation). MTDC has own resort in Tarkarli which is located exactly at beach. MTDC has also scuba diving training center. in Tarkarli where various scuba diving courses are conducted.   
To stay in Tarkarli various options are available. One can refer a website malvancity.com   on which visitors can find out contact numbers of hotel owners and more details of home stays, hotels and resorts in tarkarli.

Geography 

Education
Tarkarli has the following educational establishments:
International Scuba Diving Training Centre

Travel 
The nearest airport is chipi sindhudurg International Airport Dabolim Airport in Goa.
By rail, Tarkarli can be accessed from Sindhudurg and also from Kudal and Kankavli by the Konkan Railway.  Tarkarli is easily accessible by road from Malvan by bus and rickshaw. Tarkarli is 475 km (Panvel Kochi Road, NH 17) and 576 km (Mumbai Kohlapur Road NH 4) away from Mumbai. Daily private, luxury and State Transport bus service available from various parts of Goa, Mumbai, Pune to Malvan.

Buses from/to Panaji: direct buses run from bus bay #2 at the KTC bus stand in Panaji to Malvan, take 4.5 hours and cost 125 rupees. However, Malvan lies off the national highway (NH-17) so direct buses are infrequent (they also take a longer route). The faster option is to break the journey in parts - Panaji to Sawantwadi (56 rupees; 1.5 hours), Sawantwadi to Kudal (the closest town to Malvan on NH-17; 19 rupees, 0.5 hours), and Kudal to Malvan (30 rupees, 1 hour 15 minutes) - the total time is thus reduced to 3 hour 15 minutes.

Tourist attractions
 Mahapurush Temple
 Bhogwe beach
 Vitthal Temple
 Scuba Diving
 Boating Point & Water Sports point in Karli river
 Tarkarli Beach 
 Devbagh Sangam, the point where the Karli river drains into the Arabian sea.
 Golden Rock
 Sindhudurg Fort at Malvan
 Malvan Market 
 Rock Garden at Malwan
 Tsunami Island
 Kunkeshwar Temple - 46 km from Tarkarli by MSH 4. A Shiva temple on the beach.

See also
 Coral reefs in India

References 

Beaches of Maharashtra
Villages in Sindhudurg district
Tourist attractions in Sindhudurg district